Scaphirhynchus is a genus of sturgeons native to the United States of America. All species in this genus are considered to be threatened with extinction or worse.  As of 2023, the pallid sturgeon (S. albus) and the Alabama sturgeon (S. suttkusi) are critically endangered according to the International Union for Conservation of Nature.

Distribution
Member species are found in the Mississippi, Missouri, and Alabama Rivers.

Species
Currently, three species in this genus are recognized:
 Scaphirhynchus albus (S. A. Forbes & R. E. Richardson, 1905) (pallid sturgeon)
 Scaphirhynchus platorynchus (Rafinesque, 1820) (shovelnose sturgeon)
 Scaphirhynchus suttkusi J. D. Williams & Clemmer, 1991 (Alabama sturgeon)

References

 
Ray-finned fish genera